Greater Mongolia may refer to:
 In Pan-Mongolism, idea that advocates cultural and political solidarity of Mongols
 The contiguous geographical area in which the Mongols primarily live
 The Mongolian Plateau, comprising the majority of this region, in Mongolia, China and Russia
Buryatia
 Dzungaria, neighbouring but not part of the Mongolian Plateau
 Parts of Qinghai and Gansu where Oirats reside
 Parts of Manchuria bordering to Inner Mongolia where Khorchin Mongols reside

See also 
Mongolia (disambiguation)
Eastern Mongols (disambiguation)
Northern Mongols (disambiguation)
Upper Mongols
Oirats
Inner Mongolia
Mongol Empire